Barbus  is a genus of ray-finned fish in the family Cyprinidae. The type species of Barbus is the common barbel, first described as Cyprinus barbus and now named Barbus barbus. Barbus is the namesake genus of the subfamily Barbinae, but given their relationships, that taxon is better included in the Cyprininae at least for the largest part (including the type species of Barbus).

Description and uses
Their common names – barbs and barbels – refer to the fact that most members of the genera have a pair of barbels on their mouths, which they can use to search for food at the bottom of the water.

Barbels are often fished for food; in some locations they are of commercial significance. The roe of barbels is poisonous, however. The large Barbus barbs are also often eaten in their native range.

At Shanhûr in Egypt, remains of a jar from the sixth- to seventh-century AD were unearthed that contained  fish bones. The fish were apparently pickled to produce a dish similar to the modern fesikh (or faseekh). Among the ancient remains, barbs (perhaps Barbus perince) were plentiful, and Egyptians now still consider B. perince good for preparing fesikh, as it is traditionally done for the Sham el-Nessim (spring festival) celebrations.

The smaller barbs are in some cases traded as aquarium fish. Some are quite significant, but as a whole, the genus is not yet as well represented in aquaria as the Southeast Asian Puntius.

One species, Barbus microbarbis from Rwanda, is known to have gone extinct in recent times. Several others are only known from the type specimens, and their status and continuing existence must be confirmed. As many of these are from Lake Victoria, which underwent massive ecological upheaval after Nile perch (Lates nilosus) were introduced,  some of them likely have not survived, either.

Systematics and taxonomy
Barbus has a long history as a  "wastebasket taxon". Historically, most fish commonly known as "barbs" were usually placed here by default. More recently, many "barbs" have been reclassified into genera such as Arabibarbus, Barbichthys, Barbodes, Barboides, Barbonymus, Barbopsis, Caecobarbus, Capoeta, Carasobarbus, Clypeobarbus, Enteromius, Hypselobarbus, Hypsibarbus, Labeobarbus, Leptobarbus, Luciobarbus, Mesopotamichthys, Poropuntius, Probarbus, Pseudobarbus, Puntioplites and Puntius.

Thus, Barbus is for the time being restricted to the typical barbels and barbs', and only contains fishes from Africa and Europe, as well as adjacent Asia. However, the genus even in the reduced version is probably paraphyletic, and many African species (particularly the small ones) do not seem to belong here, either. Eventually, Barbus is likely to be restricted to the group around B. barbus – the large European to Ponto-Caspian species commonly known as "barbels". Luciobarbus and particularly Messinobarbus are highly similar and might better be included in Barbus again. They all seem to be close relatives – perhaps the closest living relatives – of Aulopyge huegelii. Carasobarbus and Labeobarbus are probably closely related to this group, too, and some large hexaploid barbs (e.g. L. reinii) may well belong in Labeobarbus.

The small barbs from Africa, by contrast, are quite distinct. They might even warrant establishment of a new subfamily – in particular if the Labeoninae are not included in the Cyprininae –, as they seem to be as distinct from barbels and typical carps, as these are from the garras (which are part of the disputed Labeoninae), rendering the old "Barbinae" paraphyletic. Within the small African barbs, several linages can be recognized. These are mostly diploid; a tetraploid group largely restricted to southern Africa is very close to Pseudobarbus and might even be included therein. In particular, the group called "redfins" may well be monophyletic and belong in Pseudobarbus entirely, instead of being split between Pseudobarbus and Barbus.

Species

 Barbus balcanicus Kotlík, Tsigenopoulos, Ráb & Berrebi, 2002 (Danube barbel)
 Barbus barbus (Linnaeus, 1758) (Common barbel)
 Barbus bergi Chichkoff, 1935 (Bulgarian barbel)
 Barbus biharicus Antal, László & Kotlík, 2016 (Biharian barbel) 
 Barbus borysthenicus Dybowski, 1862
 Barbus caninus Bonaparte, 1839 (brook barbel)
 Barbus carottae (Bianco, 1998)
 Barbus carpathicus Kotlík, Tsigenopoulos, Ráb & Berrebi, 2002 (Carpathian barbel)
 Barbus ciscaucasicus Kessler, 1877 (Terek barbel)
 Barbus cyclolepis Heckel, 1837 
 Barbus ercisianus M. S. Karaman (sr), 1971
 Barbus euboicus Stephanidis, 1950 (Evia barbel)
 Barbus goktschaicus Kessler, 1877 (Gokcha barbel)
 Barbus haasi Mertens, 1925 
 Barbus kubanicus L. S. Berg, 1913 (Kuban barbel)
 Barbus lacerta Heckel, 1843 (Kura barbel)
 Barbus lorteti Sauvage, 1882
 Barbus macedonicus S. L. Karaman, 1928
 Barbus meridionalis A. Risso, 1827 (Mediterranean barbel)
 Barbus niluferensis Turan, Kottelat & Ekmekçi, 2009
 Barbus oligolepis Battalgil, 1941
 Barbus peloponnesius Valenciennes, 1842
 Barbus pergamonensis M. S. Karaman, 1971 (Anatolian barbel)
 Barbus petenyi Heckel, 1852 (Romanian barbel)
 Barbus plebejus Bonaparte, 1839 (Italian barbel) 
 Barbus prespensis S. L. Karaman, 1924 
 Barbus rebeli Koller, 1926 (Western Balkan barbel)
 Barbus sperchiensis Stephanidis, 1950 (Sperchios barbel)
 Barbus strumicae S. L. Karaman, 1955 (Strumica barbel)
 Barbus tauricus Kessler, 1877 (Crimean barbel)
 Barbus thessalus Stephanidis, 1971 (Thessalian barbel)
 Barbus tyberinus Bonaparte, 1839 (Horse barbel)
 Barbus waleckii Rolik, 1970 (Vistula barbel)

Fossil species 
A fossil species (Barbus megacephalus Günther, 1876) is known from the Paleogene Sipang Fauna of Indonesia., but it probably should be placed in another genus.

See also
 Danionins

References

 
Cyprinidae genera
Taxa named by Georges Cuvier